Plectostoma concinnum is a species of air-breathing land snail with an operculum, a terrestrial gastropod mollusk in the family Diplommatinidae.

Description

Ecology 
Predators of Plectostoma concinnum include slugs of the genus Atopos.

References

External links

Diplommatinidae
Gastropods described in 1901